Charles H. Yale (1856-1920) was an American theatre producer and performer. Early in his career he worked for the Boylston Museum in Boston, Massachusetts. In 1897 he formed a partnership in New York with David Henderson and W.J. Gilmore to produce "spectacular, operatic and musical plays." Among Yale's theatrical productions are The Sea King, The Devil's Auction and Twelve Temptations. He went bankrupt in 1910. He belonged to the National Theatrical Producing Managers Association. He died in Rochester, New York, in 1920.

References

External links

 Library of Congress. Sheet music:
 Da, da Gussie dear by Chas. H. Yale. Boston: White, Smith & Co., 1878.
 George Augustus D'Arcy by Chas. H. Yale. Boston: Perry, John F., 1879.
  Early in de mornin'; The great Ethiopian patter-song, by Chas. H. Yale. Boston: Perry & Co., John F., 1881.
 University of Louisville, Kentucky. Portrait of Yale

1856 births
1920 deaths
American theatre managers and producers
19th century in Boston
19th-century American male actors
American male stage actors